Arend Schoemaker (8 November 1911 – 11 May 1982) was a Dutch football forward who part of the  Netherlands team in the 1934 FIFA World Cup. He also played for Quick Den Haag.

References

External links
 FIFA profile

1911 births
1982 deaths
Dutch footballers
Netherlands international footballers
Association football forwards
1934 FIFA World Cup players
People from Westerveld
H.V. & C.V. Quick players
Footballers from Drenthe